The President's Medal may refer to:

 President's Medal (British Academy)
 President's Medal (Israel), highest civil medal given by the State of Israel
 President's Medal (Royal Academy of Engineering)
 President's Medal for Shooting, awarded to champion shots by the Republic of Ciskei

See also
 President's Inauguration Medal, Sri Lanka commemoration medal
 President's Police Medal, Indian law enforcement decoration
 President's Silver Medal for Best Feature Film, see National Film Award for Best Feature Film in Kannada